The Pyrgini are a tribe in the skipper butterfly subfamily Pyrginae. Formerly, when only four tribes of Pyrginae were recognized, the Pyrgini contained the largest number of genera among these. But this overly wide delimitation has since turned out to be paraphyletic.

One of the traditional Pyrginae tribes, the Eudamini, had to be raised to subfamily rank as Eudaminae.  Some genera now in the Eudaminae were placed in the Pyrgini in earlier times. In addition, a number of additional tribes – Achlyodidini, Carcharodini and Erynnini – are now usually recognized again. These are close relatives of the Pyrgini sensu stricto, and may just as well be included in them as they used to be: together they do still form a monophyletic group. Most authors prefer to keep them separate however, as each is an apomorphic and biogeographically distinct lineage of the Pyrgini sensu lato. Of these newly recognized tribes, the Achlyodidini are closest to the Pyrgini, but conspicuously differ from the latter in their unusually-shaped wings.

Genera
The genera of the Pyrgini, after genomic research published in 2019, are:

 Anisochoria Mabille, 1877
 Antigonus Hübner, 1819
 Bralus Grishin, 2019 
 Burnsius Grishin, 2019 (New World checkered-skippers)
 Canesia Grishin, 2019
 Carrhenes Godman & Salvin, 1895
 Celotes Godman & Salvin, 1899 (streaky-skippers)
 Chirgus Grishin, 2019
 Clito Evans, 1953
 Diaeus Godman & Salvin, 1895
 Eracon Godman & Salvin, 1894
 Heliopetes Billberg, 1820 (white-skippers)
 Onenses Godman & Salvin, 1895
 Paches Godman & Salvin, 1895
 Plumbago Evans, 1953
 Pseudodrephalys Burns, 1998
 Pyrgus Hübner, 1819 (checkered-skippers)
 Santa Grishin, 2019
 Spioniades Hübner, 1819
 Systasea W. H. Edwards, 1877 (powdered-skippers)
 Trina Evans, 1953
 Xenophanes Godman & Salvin, 1895
 Zobera Freeman, 1970
 Zopyrion Godman & Salvin, 1896

Footnotes

References

  (2007): Tree of Life Web Project – Pyrgini. Version of 2007-MAR-04. Retrieved 2009-DEC-26.

 

Taxa named by Hermann Burmeister
Butterfly tribes